Archophileurus is a genus of rhinoceros beetles in the family Scarabaeidae. There are at least 30 described species in Archophileurus.

Species
These 32 species belong to the genus Archophileurus:

 Archophileurus alternans Endrödi, 1977 c g
 Archophileurus aper Endrödi, 1977 c g
 Archophileurus bifoveatus Endrödi, 1977 c g
 Archophileurus burmeisteri (Arrow, 1908) c
 Archophileurus chaconus (Kolbe, 1910) c g
 Archophileurus clarionicus Moron, 1990 c g
 Archophileurus cribrosus (LeConte, 1854) i c g b
 Archophileurus digitalia (Herbst, 1789) c g
 Archophileurus elatus (Prell, 1914) c g
 Archophileurus fimbriatus (Burmeister, 1847) c g
 Archophileurus fodiens (Kolbe, 1910) c g
 Archophileurus foveicollis (Burmeister, 1847) c g
 Archophileurus guyanus Dechambre, 2006 c g
 Archophileurus kolbeanus Ohaus, 1910 c g
 Archophileurus latipennis (Burmeister, 1847) c g
 Archophileurus mirabilis Ratcliffe & Cave, 2015 c g
 Archophileurus oedipus (Prell, 1912) c g
 Archophileurus opacostriatus (Ohaus, 1911) c g
 Archophileurus ovis (Burmeister, 1847) c g
 Archophileurus passaloides (Prell, 1914) c g
 Archophileurus peruanus Endrödi, 1977 c g
 Archophileurus petropolitanus (Ohaus, 1910) c g
 Archophileurus quadrivii Dechambre, 2006 c g
 Archophileurus simplex (Bates, 1888) c g
 Archophileurus spinosus Dechambre, 2006 c g
 Archophileurus sus Dechambre, 2006 c g
 Archophileurus temnorrhynchodes Lamant-Voirin, 1995 c g
 Archophileurus tmetoplus (Prell, 1912) c g
 Archophileurus trituberculatus Endrödi, 1977 c g
 Archophileurus vervex (Burmeister, 1847) c g
 Archophileurus wagneri (Ohaus, 1911) c g
 Archophileurus zischkai Endrödi, 1981 c g

Data sources: i = ITIS, c = Catalogue of Life, g = GBIF, b = Bugguide.net

References

Further reading

 
 
 
 

Dynastinae
Articles created by Qbugbot